Elections to Gloucestershire County Council took place on 2 May 2013 as part of the 2013 United Kingdom local elections. 53 electoral divisions elected one county councillor each by first-past-the-post voting for a four-year term of office. No elections were held in South Gloucestershire, which is a unitary authority outside the area covered by the County Council.

Control of the council went from the Conservative Party to no party having overall control. Turnout across the county was 32% with 151,250 votes cast. The Conservatives gained most votes in four of the six parliamentary seats, the Liberal Democrats coming first in Cheltenham and UKIP in the Forest of Dean. The Conservatives were the only party to win a county council seat in every district.

All locally registered electors (British, Irish, Commonwealth and European Union citizens) who were aged 18 or over on Thursday 2 May 2013 were entitled to vote in the local elections. Those who were temporarily away from their ordinary address (for example, away working, on holiday, in student accommodation or in hospital) were also entitled to vote in the local elections, although those who had moved abroad and registered as overseas electors cannot vote in the local elections. It is possible to register to vote at more than one address (such as a university student who had a term-time address and lives at home during holidays) at the discretion of the local Electoral Register Office, but it remains an offence to vote more than once in the same local government election.

County Council single-member electoral review 2012-13
Going into the elections, the Conservatives held a majority of 21 seats. Due to boundary changes and a reduction in the number of councillors from 63 to 53 following a public consultation by the Local Government Boundary Commission for England the notional results to be used for the purposes of election planning and comparison before the election were: Conservatives - 36, Liberal Democrats - 10, Labour - 4, People Against Bureaucracy - 1, Greens - 1, Independents - 1.  This gave a notional Conservative majority of 17 seats.

Summary
The Conservative Party lost 13 notional seats, although the numerical loss was larger due to the reduction in the total number of councillors. The Liberal Democrats remained the second largest party by total seats and percentage vote, while the Labour Party had the largest net gain of five seats. UKIP won representation on the county council for the first time, winning three seats.

The number of Independent councillors rose to two, while both the Green Party and People Against Bureaucracy saw their only councillors re-elected.

Results

|}

Results by District

Results by Division

Cheltenham

Cotswold

Forest of Dean

Gloucester

Stroud

Tewkesbury

By-elections between 2013 and 2017

Mitcheldean
A by-election was held for the Mitcheldean Division on 23 October 2014 following the death of Independent councillor Norman Stephens.

Churchdown
A by-election was held on Thursday 5 May 2016 for the Churchdown Division due to the death of County Councillor Bill Whelan.

Notes and references
Notes 
  
References
 
4. ^ http://glostext.gloucestershire.gov.uk/mgElectionResults.aspx?ID=3&V=1&RPID=32877983 - Accessed 4-5-2013

2013
2013 English local elections
2010s in Gloucestershire